Lebanon competed at the 2012 Summer Olympics in London, from 27 July to 12 August 2012. This was the nation's sixteenth appearance at the Olympics, except the 1956 Summer Olympics in Melbourne as a response to the Suez Crisis.

The Lebanese Olympic Committee sent the nation's largest delegation to the Games, after the 1992 Summer Olympics in Barcelona. A total of 10 athletes, 3 men and 7 women, competed in 7 different sports. For the first time in its Olympic history, Lebanon was represented by more female than male athletes. Three of its athletes were born in the United States: foil fencers and siblings Zain and Mona Shaito, and freestyle swimmer Katya Bachrouche. Two other athletes had competed in Beijing, including sprinter Gretta Taslakian, who was at her third consecutive Olympics. Asian Games silver medalist Andrea Paoli, who became the first Lebanese taekwondo jin to participate in the Olympics, was the nation's flag bearer at the opening ceremony.

Lebanon, however, failed to win an Olympic medal in London since the 1980 Summer Olympics in Moscow, where Hassan Bchara won the bronze for Greco-Roman wrestling.

Athletics

Lebanon has qualified 2 athletes.

Men

Women

Fencing

Lebanon has qualified 2 fencers.

Men

Women

Judo

Lebanon has had 1 judoka invited.

Shooting

Women

Swimming

Lebanese swimmers have so far achieved qualifying standards in the following events (up to a maximum of 2 swimmers in each event at the Olympic Qualifying Time (OQT), and potentially 1 at the Olympic Selection Time (OST)):

Men

Women

Table tennis

Lebanon qualified one woman.

Taekwondo

Lebanon has qualified the following quota place.

See also
Lebanon at the 2012 Summer Paralympics

References

External links

Nations at the 2012 Summer Olympics
2012
2012 in Lebanese sport